The 1938 Individual Speedway World Championship was the third edition of the official World Championship to determine the world champion rider.

The Championship was won by the 28 year-old Australian Arthur 'Bluey' Wilkinson, in front of a new record crowd for speedway of 95,000. The newspapers reported that despite extra police one of the worst traffic jams of the year resulted after the meeting was over and that the air was thick with petrol fumes.

World final
1 September 1938
 London, Wembley Stadium
Attendance: 95,000 (all-time Wembley speedway attendance record)

References

1938
Individual World Championship
Individual Speedway World Championship
Individual Speedway World Championship
Speedway competitions in the United Kingdom